Complete results for Women's Giant Slalom competition at the 2009 World Championships.  It was run on February 12, the seventh race of the championships.

Women's giant slalom
2009 in French women's sport
FIS